The Potomac and Chesapeake Association for College Admissions Counseling (PCACAC) is a professional organization that was founded in 1964 for those who work with students in the transition between high school and college.

Based in Columbia, Maryland, PCACAC is the regional affiliate of the National Association for College Admission Counseling (NACAC) serving:
 Delaware,
 the District of Columbia,
 Maryland,
 Virginia and
 West Virginia.

PCACAC exists to maintain high professional standards at both the secondary and college levels and to connect college admissions officers, secondary school counselors, independent counselors and educational organizations to discuss common professional concerns and to explore ways to empower students.

See also
 College admissions in the United States
 Higher education in the United States
 Transfer admissions in the United States

External links 
 PCACAC website

University and college admissions